Harold Glyn Glasgow (February 4, 1929 – January 19, 2020) was a major general in the United States Marine Corps who served as commanding general of Marine Corps Recruit Depot. He is an alumnus of the University of Alabama. Glasgow served as commanding officer of 6th Marine Regiment from 8 May 1975 to 3 June 1976.

References

United States Marine Corps generals
1929 births
2020 deaths